Centerville is a census-designated place (CDP) in the rural northeastern corner of Franklin County, North Carolina, United States. The population was 149 at the 2020 census. It was an incorporated town from 1965 to 2017.

Centerville is centered on "the crossroads", which is the intersection of NC-561 and NC-58 and the site of two small old-fashioned general stores.

Centerville has a church, (Centerville Baptist Church, a member of the Southern Baptist Convention), and volunteer fire department. There is not a police department, so Centerville, like the surrounding unincorporated area, is patrolled by the Franklin County Sheriff's Office.

As is common in the rural stretches of eastern North Carolina, many of the houses in and around Centerville are quite old and in poor states of repair, and agriculture is the main use of land. Tobacco, soybeans, corn, and hay are the main crops.

Centerville includes many antique buildings from its heyday, including the now-defunct Serepta Church, a former Methodist church located at the intersection of NC-561 and Centerville-Laurel Mill Road.

Perry School and Vine Hill are listed on the National Register of Historic Places.

History
Centerville was established circa 1882 and named for its central location between the towns of Louisburg, Warrenton and Littleton. It was incorporated in 1965, four years after the dissolution of the nearby town of Wood.

Geography
Centerville is located at  (36.184980, −78.111252).

Demographics

2020 census

As of the 2020 United States census, there were 149 people, 103 households, and 85 families residing in the CDP.

2010 census
As of the census of 2010, there were 89 people residing in what was then a town. The racial makeup of the town was 93% White (83 persons), 3.5% Black (3 persons), and 3.5% other (3 persons).

Dissolution
On February 22, 2017, a bill was filed in the North Carolina General Assembly seeking legislative approval for dissolution of the Town of Centerville.  The Centerville Town Council voted unanimously in their January meeting to dissolve the town charter due to Centerville's lack of growth and its financial inability to continue as a municipality.  When the bill is passed, the town will have 30 days to pay off its bills and liquidate its assets.  Under the legislation, any remaining money would be given to Centerville Fire Department.  Senate Bill 122, regarding the dissolution of the Town of Centerville, was ratified by the North Carolina General Assembly on June 22, 2017. The town officially dissolved on July 22, 2017.

References

 William S. Powell, The North Carolina Gazetteer: A Dictionary of Tar Heel Places, 1968, The University of North Carolina Press at Chapel Hill, Library of Congress Catalog Card #28-25916, page 98. Retrieved Jan. 15, 2015.

Census-designated places in Franklin County, North Carolina
Census-designated places in North Carolina
Former municipalities in North Carolina
Populated places disestablished in 2017